Guru Smt. Rajee Narayan (1931-2020) was a Bharatanatyam dancer, musician and composer living in Mumbai, India. She was a rare combination of guru, musician, composer and choreographer, with the unique distinction of teaching not only Bharatanatyam, but also Carnatic Music, Natyasastra and Nattuvangam. She established her institution, Nritya Geethanjali in Mumbai in 1965. She has served as board member of the University of Mumbai, for over two decades and as the external examiner for the Bachelors and master's degrees in the Fine Arts courses (Bachelor of Fine Arts and Master of Fine Arts) and examiner of thesis for Ph.D.

Formative years 
Rajee Narayan was born on 19 August 1931 in Chennai, the 11th child of S. Narayana Iyer and Gangammal. Rajee started to learn Bharatanatyam at age 5, from her elder sister, Neela Balasubramaniam, founder-director, Nataraja Natya Niketan and K. Lalitha, founder-director, Sri Saraswathi Gana Nilayam.

At the age of four, Narayan commercially recorded the composition, 'Neraminchakura' (Shankarabharanam raga – Ikana tala). She also released records on story-telling songs for children and some plays. At that early age, she had started acting and singing her own songs in the movies that her father produced.

She participated in the dance-dramas and Kollata Jothrai festivals, conducted by Kadappai Lakshmiammal, through her sabha, Indumadar Lakshmi Vilasa Sabha, run specially for ladies.

Compositions 
Narayan has composed over 200 songs for bharatanatyam and has published some of them in her book Nritya Geetamala (2 volumes). She has also released a book on the basics of carnatic music called Sangeeta Shastra Mala. She is also the author of Natya shastra mala, a book explaining the basics of natya shastram.

References

External links
 Official website

1931 births
Musicians from Mumbai
Indian female classical dancers
Indian women composers
20th-century Indian composers
2020 deaths
Bharatanatyam exponents
Performers of Indian classical dance
20th-century Indian dancers
Women musicians from Maharashtra
20th-century Indian women musicians
Dancers from Maharashtra
20th-century women composers